The 1962–63 Volleyball Women's European Cup was the third edition of the official competition for European women's volleyball national champions. It was contested by eleven teams, with West Germany making its debut, and the quarterfinals and semifinals were reinstated instead of the previous edition's group stage. WVC Dynamo Moscow defeated AZS Warsaw to win its second title.

Preliminary round

Quarterfinals

Semifinals

Final

References

European Cup
European Cup
CEV Women's Champions League